A hedgehog slice is an uncooked flat, square or bar-shaped chocolate snack/dessert, similar to a fudgey chocolate brownie but with alternating lighter and darker areas. The darker areas are chocolate flavoured. The lighter areas are crushed biscuit, rice puffs, or similar.  Nuts may also be added.  It usually has a topping of chocolate icing on which may be sprinkled coconut, hundreds and thousands, or other kinds of sprinkles or raisins  (e.g. chocolate or coffee flavoured, etc.).

The dish goes by a variety of names. In some languages it is named after its appearance, such as Swedish  (named for both its resemblance to old-time radios and its ability to be eaten soundlessly so as to not disturb radio broadcasts), Turkish  or Greek . The Danish  and Serbo-Croatian  simply mean biscuit cake. The Dutch name  comes from a promotional recipe book published by Calvé and is named after its mascot character, while the Norwegian  refers to the Delfia deep-frying fat mentioned in this recipe.

The dish is derived from chocolate salami which was invented in the beginning of the twentieth century and which in turn traces its heritage to various kinds of fake sausage confectionery without chocolate from the start of the nineteenth century. 

Many German histories refer to a 1920s recipe from baking firm Bahlsen that combined chocolate with packaged cookies. The name "Kalter Hund" has been theorized to have passed into German through the Slovakian word  (box-shaped trolley), which might have been a reference to the rectangular pans in which the dessert is often made. In Germany, it is often described as a retro food that conjures nostalgic associations of the 1950s. In 2017, inhabitants of Ronneburg made a 994.9 meter long cake, the longest to date in Germany.

See also

 Batik cake, Malaysian version of Hedgehog slice
 Chocolate biscuit pudding, Sri Lankan version of Hedgehog slice
 List of desserts

References

External links
 A recipe from ABC North Queensland

Australian desserts
Chocolate desserts
German cuisine
German desserts
German cakes
No bake cakes